Louisa United Methodist Church is a historic church at Main Cross and Madison Streets in Louisa, Kentucky.  It was built in 1916 and added to the National Register of Historic Places in 1988.

The present church, built in 1916, is the third building for the congregation.  Little is known about the previous buildings and the current building's plans, reportedly because records about the church are stored within its cornerstone and hence unavailable.

References

United Methodist churches in Kentucky
Churches on the National Register of Historic Places in Kentucky
Neoclassical architecture in Kentucky
Churches completed in 1916
20th-century Methodist church buildings in the United States
National Register of Historic Places in Lawrence County, Kentucky
1916 establishments in Kentucky
Neoclassical church buildings in the United States
Louisa, Kentucky